James Malcolm Marcus Humphrey CBE OStJ DL FRICS (born 1 May 1938) is a Scottish Conservative Party politician.

He was educated at Eton and Christ Church, Oxford and on 15 October 1963, he married Sabrina Margaret Pooley. In 1969 he was admitted to the Royal Company of Archers. He was Chairman of Finance of Aberdeenshire County Council from 1970 to 1975, Chairman of Finance of Grampian Council from 1974 to 1978 (and Deputy Chairman from 1978 to 1986). He was the Conservative candidate in the 1991 Kincardine and Deeside by-election, coming second to Nicol Stephen of the Scottish Liberal Democrats.

He served as the Grand Master Mason of the Grand Lodge of Scotland from 1983 to 1988. He served as Sovereign Grand Commander of the Supreme Council for Scotland of the Scottish Rite from 1995 until 2022.

His family own the Dinnet Estate in Aberdeenshire, he was a Deputy Lord Lieutenant of Aberdeenshire and was formerly Deputy Provost of Aberdeenshire Council while a Conservative Councillor for Aboyne, Upper Deeside and Donside.

References
Burke's Peerage
Who's Who 2009

1938 births
Living people
Commanders of the Order of the British Empire
Scottish Conservative Party councillors
Deputy Lieutenants of Aberdeenshire
Officers of the Order of St John
People educated at Eton College
Alumni of Christ Church, Oxford
Members of the Royal Company of Archers
Conservative Party (UK) parliamentary candidates